John Markham Baldock (19 November 1915 – 3 October 2003) was a British Conservative politician who served as a Member of Parliament (MP) in the 1950s.

Baldock was born in Hollingbourne, Kent. At the 1950 general election, he was elected as the MP for Harborough in Leicestershire, defeating the sitting Labour MP Humphrey Attewell. Baldock held the seat until he stood down from the House of Commons at the 1959 general election. He died in Chichester aged 87.

An amateur yachtsman, he sailed the ketch-rigged yacht Racundra, originally built for Arthur Ransome, for about 20 years.

References

External links 
 

1915 births
2003 deaths
Conservative Party (UK) MPs for English constituencies
UK MPs 1950–1951
UK MPs 1951–1955
UK MPs 1955–1959
British sailors